Mateusz Gradecki (born 4 June 1994) is a Polish professional golfer who plays on the Challenge Tour. He won the 2022 Limpopo Championship, becoming the first Sunshine Tour winner and only the second Challenge Tour winner to hail from Poland.

Amateur career
Gradecki was born in Trzebnica and grew up in Oborniki Śląskie. His father Krzysztof owned the Eko supermarket chain and has been featured on lists of the 100 richest Poles. He also built the Gradi Golf Club in Brzeźno, where his son practices. Gradecki attended East Tennessee State University from 2013 to 2017 and played with the East Tennessee State Buccaneers men's golf team alongside compatriot Adrian Meronk. 

Gradecki represented Poland in the Eisenhower Trophy in 2012, 2014 and 2016. He won the Polish Amateur five times and finished third at the 2017 Wrocław Open.

Professional career
Gradecki turned professional early 2018 and joined the Pro Golf Tour. In September, he won the New Golf Club Matchplay Championship in Germany and finished fifth in the Order of Merit to get promotion to the Challenge Tour. He had a disappointing rookie season and made only four cuts. Back on the Pro Golf Tour, he won the 2019 Open Prestigia and the 2021 Red Sea Egyptian Classic.

On the Challenge Tour again for the 2021 season, he finished 68th in the Challenge Tour Order of Merit to keep his card, after recording several top-10 finishes including a season best of tied 6th at the Sydbank Esbjerg Challenge.

In April 2022, Gradecki won the co-sanctioned Limpopo Championship in South Africa to become the first Pole to win on the Sunshine Tour, and only the second Challenge Tour winner to hail from Poland, after Adrian Meronk. In July, he lost a playoff at the German Challenge to Alejandro del Rey of Spain, who won with a birdie at the second playoff hole.

Amateur wins
2011 Polish Amateur 
2012 Polish Amateur 
2013 Polish Amateur 
2014 Faldo Series Poland
2015 Polish Amateur 
2016 Polish Amateur
2017 MVK Turkish International Amateur Open Championship

Source:

Professional wins (4)

Sunshine Tour wins (1)

1Co-sanctioned by the Challenge Tour

Challenge Tour wins (1)

1Co-sanctioned by the Sunshine Tour

Challenge Tour playoff record (0–1)

Pro Golf Tour wins (3)

Team appearances
Amateur
European Boys' Team Championship (representing Poland): 2009
Eisenhower Trophy (representing Poland): 2012, 2014, 2016
European Amateur Team Championship (representing Poland): 2015

Professional
European Championships (representing Poland): 2018

References

External links
 
 
 

Polish male golfers
East Tennessee State Buccaneers men's golfers
People from Oborniki Śląskie
1994 births
Living people